David Cross (born 1964) is an American comedian and actor.

David Cross may also refer to:
 
 David Cross, British artist from the pair Cornford & Cross
 David Cross (footballer, born 1950), English footballer
 David Cross (footballer, born 1982), English footballer for Notts County
 David Cross (musician) (born 1949), English rock violinist

See also
 David Kross (born 1990), German actor